I Can See Your Voice is a Philippine television mystery music game show series produced and distributed locally by ABS-CBN Entertainment, based on the South Korean program of the same name. Since its premiere on September 16, 2017, it has aired five seasons on four different networks — ABS-CBN (from 2017 to 2020); Kapamilya Channel and A2Z (since 2020); and TV5 (since 2023).

Gameplay

Format
Presented with a group of five "mystery singers" identified only by their occupation, a guest artist must attempt to eliminate bad singers from the group without ever hearing them sing, assisted by clues and a celebrity panel (also known as SING-vestigators) over the course of three rounds. At the end of the game, the last remaining mystery singer is revealed as either good or bad by means of a duet between them and one of the guest artists.

Rewards
If singer is good, the guest artist wins an award (as Eyeward) and he/she will compete at Tawag ng Tanghalan. The winning singer, regardless of being good (SEE-nger) or bad (SEE-ntunado), wins .

Rounds
Each episode presents the guest artist with five people whose identities and singing voices are kept concealed until they are eliminated to perform on the "stage of truth" or remain in the end to perform the final duet.

Notes:

Production

Background and development
ABS-CBN first announced the development of the series in collaboration with Endemol Shine Group on August 2017. It is produced by ABS-CBN Entertainment; the staff team is managed by executive producers Rose Casala, Laurenti Dyogi, Marvi Gelito, Carlo Katigbak, Cory Vidanes and Luis Andrada; and director Joane Laygo.

Filming
Tapings for the program took place at the ABS-CBN Broadcasting Center in Brgy. South Triangle, Diliman, Quezon City.

In the third and fourth season, the program was filmed under health and safety protocols due to the COVID-19 pandemic. This resulted in prematurely ending the second season, as production halted from March 2020, and later second indefinite network shutdown and denial of franchise.

Broadcast

History
I Can See Your Voice debuted on September 16, 2017, as a replacement to Lethal Weapon. In the second season having premiered on August 10, 2019, it was prematurely ended on March 14, 2020. The third season then premiered on October 24, 2020, coinciding the inaugural broadcast of TV5's rival show Masked Singer Pilipinas. The fourth season has an initial premiere on January 8, 2022, but it was delayed until it happened on January 15, 2022, with the airing of 1MX Manila 2021 that occupied its original premiere week. For the fifth season broadcasts, Kapamilya Channel and A2Z premiered first on March 4, 2023, followed by TV5 on March 11, 2023.

The show was originally aired on ABS-CBN for two seasons. For the second time in ICSYV franchise since its original South Korean counterpart simulcasting on Mnet and tvN, interim broadcasters Kapamilya Channel and A2Z did its similar manner (since the third season), followed by TV5 (since the fifth season). Outside of the Philippines through international transmissions, it is also aired on TFC. For digital platforms, it is available to broadcast on YouTube via Kapamilya Online Live streaming and iWantTFC through video on demand.

Special episodes and companion events
As part of the series' first anniversary (of the first season), a prelude episode (dubbed as Best Mode) aired on September 9, 2018, followed by Daniel Padilla playing on entire Kalokalike alumni as mystery singers on September 15, 2018.

Since the fourth season, it has a companion event titled I Can Guess Your Voice, an in-game event whose watchers (acting as Home SING-vestigators) use social media to correctly guess the outcome of winning mystery singer, either it was good or bad by means of a duet with one of the guest artists.

Cast
The series employs a team of "celebrity panelists" who decipher mystery singers' evidences throughout the game. Alongside with full-timers and additional ones, guest panelists also appear since the first season. Throughout its broadcast, the program has assigned 14 different panelists. The original members consist of Wacky Kiray, Kean Cipriano, Alex Gonzaga, Andrew E., and Angeline Quinto.

Series overview

Accolades

See also
Catalogs:
List of programs broadcast by ABS-CBN
List of programs distributed by ABS-CBN
List of programs broadcast by A2Z (Philippine TV channel)
List of programs broadcast by Kapamilya Channel
List of programs streamed by Kapamilya Online Live
List of programs broadcast by TV5 (Philippine TV network)
Other topics:
ABS-CBN franchise renewal controversy
Tawag ng Tanghalan

Notes

References

External links

 
2010s Philippine television series
2020s Philippine television series
2017 Philippine television series debuts
ABS-CBN original programming
English-language television shows
Filipino-language television shows
Philippine game shows
Philippine television series based on South Korean television series
Television productions suspended due to the COVID-19 pandemic